Ken McCracken (died 28 October 2019) was a New Zealand rugby league footballer who represented New Zealand. His son, Jarrod, also represented New Zealand.

Playing career
McCracken played for the Ellerslie Eagles club in the Auckland Rugby League competition, and also played for Ellerslie's combined district team Eastern United. He was an Auckland representative and played in seven test matches for New Zealand. He was first selected for New Zealand for their 1961 tour of Great Britain and France and again played on their 1963 tour of Australia and in 1964 home matches against France.

McCracken later played for the Ponsonby Ponies club in Auckland.

Death
McCracken died from metastatic prostate cancer on 28 October 2019.

References

Year of birth missing
2019 deaths
New Zealand rugby league players
New Zealand national rugby league team players
Auckland rugby league team players
Rugby league wingers
Ellerslie Eagles players
Ponsonby Ponies players
Deaths from cancer in New Zealand
Deaths from prostate cancer